Adi Kailash (Kumaoni: आदि कैलाश), also known as Shiva Kailash, Chota Kailash, Baba Kailash or Jonglingkong Peak, is a mountain located in the Himalayan mountain range in the Pithoragarh district of Uttarakhand, India.

Both Adi Kailash and Om Parvat are considered sacred by Hindus.

About

The Adi Kailash and the Om Parvat are not one and the same.

The Adi Kailash or Chota Kailash is located in a different direction, near Sin La pass and near Brahma Parvat, the base camp of Adi Kailash is 17 km from the Kutti village at sacred Jolingkong Lake with Lord Shiva temple.

Om Parvat can be viewed in route to the Kailash Manasarovar Yatra from the last camp below Lipulekh Pass at Nabhidhang India-China border post protected by the Indo-Tibetan Border Police also has Public Works Department guest house on the Indian side. Many trekkers to Adi Kailash often make a diversion to view Om Parvat. Om Parvat is located near Nabhi Dhang camp on Mount Kailash-Lake Manasarovar yatra route.

First Ascent
From 19 Sept to 14 Oct 2002 the first attempt, which was abandoned  short of the summit because of very loose snow and rock conditions, was made by an Indo-Aussie-British-Scottish team including Martin Moran, T. Rankin, M. Singh, S. Ward, A. Williams and R. Ausden. The climbers promised not to ascend the final  out of respect for the peak's holy status.

On 8 October 2004, the first successful ascent of Adi Kailash was by the British-Scottish-American team composed of Tim Woodward, Jack Pearse, Andy Perkins (UK); Jason Hubert, Martin Welch, Diarmid Hearns, Amanda George (Scotland); and Paul Zuchowski (USA), who did not ascend the final few metres out of respect for the sacred nature of the summit.

Adi Kailash Yatra Circuit
The Adi Kailash Yatra Circuit begins by going up the Darma Valley and then going to Kuthi Yankti Valley (India) via the Sin La pass to join the Mount Kailash-Lake Manasarovar Tibetan pilgrimage route down the Sharda River. Motoroable Route to Adi Kailash is via Gunji. While approaching Gunji from Dharcula and the rest of India, the route along the western bank of Sharda River (also called Mahakali River) at Gunji forks into two separate motorable routes, one goes north to Kailash-Mansarovar and another to the west to Adi Kailash. In July 2020, India also opened a newly constructed road in this area from Gunji to Limpiyadhura Pass (Lampiya Dhura Pass on India-China border) which has reduced the trek time to Adi Kailash to two hours. Earlier in May 2020, India had inaugurated a new 80 km long road from Dharchula via Gunji to Lipulekh Pass on India-China border [under geostrategic India-China Border Roads project] to the Kailas-Manasarovar.

See also
 Char Dham
 Hindu pilgrimage sites in India 
 Kalapani territory 
 Yatra
 Om Parvat
 Kinnaur Kailash
 Manimahesh Kailash
 Shrikhand Kailash
 Mount Kailash

References

Hindu pilgrimage sites in India
Mountains of Uttarakhand
Geography of Pithoragarh district
Six-thousanders of the Himalayas